Claire Vautrin (nee Duranton) (1 April 1917 – 21 June 1995) was a French sprint canoeist who competed in the late 1940s. She finished eighth in the K-1 500 m event at the 1948 Summer Olympics in London. She was born in Paris, France and died in Bergerac, France.

References 
 Sports-reference.com profile
 

Canoeists at the 1948 Summer Olympics
French female canoeists
Olympic canoeists of France
1917 births
1995 deaths